The 2021 ICC Women's T20 World Cup Asia Qualifier was a cricket tournament that took place in the United Arab Emirates in November 2021. The matches were played with Women's Twenty20 International (WT20I) status, with the top team progressing to the 2022 ICC Women's T20 World Cup Qualifier tournament. Bhutan and Myanmar were originally scheduled to make their debuts at an ICC women's event. Originally scheduled to take place in September 2021, the tournament was postponed in May 2021 due to the COVID-19 pandemic.

Nepal's preparations included a three-match WT20I series against Qatar in Doha the week before the qualifier. Bhutan and the United Arab Emirates scheduled two warm-up matches against each other in Ajman. The second match of the tournament, between Hong Kong and Nepal, was the 1,000th WT20I to be played. The United Arab Emirates won the tournament, winning all five of their matches, progressing to the World Cup Qualifier. Nepal's Sita Rana Magar was named as the player of the tournament.

Squads
The following teams competed in the tournament:

Points table

 advanced to the global qualifier

Fixtures

References

External links
 Series home at ESPN Cricinfo

 
2021 in women's cricket
Associate international cricket competitions in 2021–22
ICC Women's T20 World Cup Asia Qualifier
ICC